Spiker is an American 1986 sports drama film directed by Roger Tilton.

Plot
As a sports drama, Spiker centers on the United States men's national volleyball team at the 1984 Summer Olympics. Superstar college athletes train hard to be accepted onto the team with the help of a strict coach.

Cast 
 Michael Parks as Coach Doames
 Christopher Allport as Newt Steinbech
 Jo McDonnell as Marcia Steinbech
 Natasha Shneider as Wanda

In other media
It was parodied by RiffTrax on August 30, 2018.

References

External links

The full movie on Tubi
Review of the film by Mutant Reviewers

1986 films
1986 drama films
1980s sports drama films
American sports drama films
1980s English-language films
Films about the Summer Olympics
Volleyball films
1980s American films